Hazenia is a genus of green algae in the family Gayraliaceae.

The genus name of Hazenia is in honour of Tracy Elliot Hazen (1874–1943), who was an American botanist and author specializing in the study of fresh water sourced algae.

The genus was circumscribed by Harold Charles Bold in Amer. J. Bot. vol.45 on page 742 in 1958.

References

External links

Ulvophyceae genera
Ulotrichales